Mister Roberts is a 1948 play based on the 1946 Thomas Heggen novel of the same name.

Broadway producer Leland Hayward acquired the rights for the play and hired Heggen and Joshua Logan for the adaptation.

Mister Roberts opened on Broadway at the Alvin Theatre on February 18, 1948, starring Henry Fonda, David Wayne, Robert Keith, and Jocelyn Brando, who replaced Eva Marie Saint before the show opened. Logan's brother-in-law, William Harrigan, played the Captain. The original production also featured Harvey Lembeck, Ralph Meeker, Steven Hill, Lee Van Cleef, and Murray Hamilton. Fonda got out of a Hollywood film contract to star in the Broadway theatre stage production. He won the Tony Award for Best Actor in a Play. The production ran for 1,157 performances.  Fonda later reprised his role of Lieutenant Roberts in the 1955 film of the same name.

A book dramatizing the play, co-authored by Heggen and Logan and also titled Mister Roberts, was published by Random House in 1948. New York Times critic Lewis Nichols praised the work as standing on its own.

Tyrone Power starred in the London company. John Forsythe appeared in a national touring production. Many actors began their careers in various productions and touring companies. Fess Parker began his show-business career in the play, in 1951.

Joshua Logan's account of his collaboration with Thomas Heggen in the writing of the play is in Logan's autobiography, Josh: My Up and Down, In and Out Life.

In 1963 the play was back on Broadway with Hugh O'Brian in the main role. Also in the 1963 Mister Roberts play was Chris Noel, Will Hutchins, Vincent Gardenia, Tony Mordente, Alan Yorke, Vince O'Brien, Bill Fletcher, John J. Martin, directed by Billy Matthews.

Awards and nominations

References

 .
 .
 .
 .

External links
 
 
 1953 Best Plays radio adaptation of play at Internet Archive

1948 plays
Broadway plays
American plays adapted into films
Plays about World War II
Plays based on novels
Tony Award-winning plays